Ajá is an Orisha, the spirit of the forest, the animals within it and herbal healers.  In her forests she would find plants with medicinal properties and mix the herbs and roots and other plant parts together to find cures for the sick. Ajá shared much of her knowledge with humans waiting for someone to come and find her to share it with. This person was usually a shaman in training, or someone of the like.

It’s believed that if someone is carried away by Ajá and then returns, they become a powerful “jujuman” or (babalawo). The journey supposedly will have a duration of between 7 days to 3 months, and the person is thought to have gone to the land of the dead or heaven. Ajá is considered one of the rarest Earth Gods because she reveals herself to humans and not to harm or scare them.

She also goes by the name "wild wind."

Yoruba goddesses
Nature goddesses
Health goddesses